Slobodan Topalović (8 November 1952 – May 1994) was a Serbian football goalkeeper. He is considered to be one of Olympique Lyonnais best ever goalkeepers and has been named the best ever Yugoslavian to associate with the club. His son was also a professional footballer who played in Iran, Kazakhstan, Serbia and is now a goalkeeping coach for Emirates Club. Slobodan played in West Germany, before having a stint of two years with OFK Belgrade. He then ended his career with Olympique Lyonnais.

References

External links

1952 births
1994 deaths
Yugoslav footballers
Serbian footballers
1. FC Köln players
Bundesliga players
OFK Beograd players
Olympique Lyonnais players
Ligue 1 players
Ligue 2 players
Sportspeople from Čačak
FC Viktoria Köln players
Association football goalkeepers